FC Baltika is an association football club based in Kaliningrad, Russia. Currently the club plays in the Russian First League, the second tier of the Russian football pyramid.

History
The club was founded on 22 December 1954 as Pishchevik Kaliningrad. In 1958 the club was renamed Baltika.

The team entered the Soviet League in 1957 and played in Class B (1957–1965), Class A, Group 2 (1966–1970), and Second League (1971–1991). The best result was achieved in 1984, when Baltika won the regional group tournament.

In 1992 Baltika entered the Russian Second Division and won the regional tournament and promotion to the First Division. After a fourth-place finish in 1993 and third position in 1994 Baltika won the division in 1995. In 1996 Baltika achieved the best result in club's history, finishing 7th in the Top Division, the Russian Premier League. Baltika were relegated in 1998, spending a total of three seasons in the top flight. In 1998 Baltika participated in the Intertoto Cup and reached the third round.

Since then, Baltika played in the First Division, except for the 2002 and 2005 seasons which they spent in the Second Division.

In 2018–19 Russian Football National League, they finished 16th (a relegation spot). However, PFL zone East winners FC Sakhalin Yuzhno-Sakhalinsk did not apply for the FNL license, keeping Baltika in the league.

League results

Current squad
As of 16 February 2023, according to the official First League website.

Out on loan

Reserve team

Reserve team
Baltika's reserve team played professionally in the Russian Third League in 1994 as FC Baltika-d Kaliningrad and in the Russian Second Division in 2006 and 2007 as FC Baltika-2 Kaliningrad.

Notable players
These players had international caps for their respective countries. Players whose name is listed in bold represented their countries while playing for Baltika.

Russia/USSR
 Sergei Shvetsov
   Oleg Sergeyev
 Maksim Buznikin
 Nikita Chernov
 Vyacheslav Dayev
 Andrei Fedkov
 Lyubomir Kantonistov
 Yevgeni Kharlachyov
 Andrei Kondrashov
 Artyom Makarchuk
 Pavel Pogrebnyak
 Dmitry Stotsky
 Sergei Terekhov
  Vladislav Lemish

Former USSR countries
 Artak Aleksanyan
 Aram Voskanyan
 Robert Zebelyan
 Emin Agaev
 Gurban Gurbanov
 Mehdi Jannatov
 Aslan Kerimov

 Dmitriy Kramarenko
 Yuri Muzika
 Vasili Baranov
 Syarhey Herasimets
 Alyaksandr Klimenka
 Andrei Lavrik
 Uladzimir Makowski
 Valer Shantalosau
 Yuri Shukanov
 Maksim Skavysh
 Sergey Vekhtev
 Taavi Rähn
 Zaza Janashia
 Zviad Jeladze
 Levan Mikadze
 Tengiz Sichinava
 Renat Dubinskiy
 Dmitriy Galich
 Dmitriy Lyapkin
 Maksim Nizovtsev
 Aleksandr Sklyarov
 Aleksandrs Koliņko
 Mihails Miholaps

 Igors Troickis
 Aleksejs Višņakovs
 Maksims Rafaļskis
 Artūrs Zjuzins
 Vidas Alunderis
 Vytautas Apanavičius
 Ričardas Beniušis
 Orestas Buitkus
 Rolandas Džiaukštas
 Andrius Jokšas
 Kestutis Kumza
 Viktoras Olšanskis
 Goran Maznov
 Valeriu Andronic
 Vyacheslav Krendelyov
 Oleksandr Pomazun
 Vladyslav Prudius
 Serhiy Shyshchenko
 Dmytro Topchiev
 Andrei Fyodorov
 Maksim Shatskikh
 Andrei Vlasichev

Club staff

|}

External links
Official website

References

 
Association football clubs established in 1954
Football clubs in Russia
Sport in Kaliningrad
1954 establishments in Russia